Henry Verney Maynard (17 May 1890 – 20 October 1947) was an Australian rules footballer who played with Richmond in the Victorian Football League (VFL).

Notes

External links 

1890 births
1947 deaths
Australian rules footballers from Victoria (Australia)
Richmond Football Club players